Brooklyn Community Board 8 is a New York City community board that encompasses the Brooklyn neighborhoods of Crown Heights, Prospect Heights, and Weeksville. It is delimited by Flatbush Avenue on the west, Atlantic Avenue on the north, Ralph Avenue on the east, and Eastern Parkway on the south.

Its current Chairperson is Irsa Weatherspoon, Robert Matthews is Chair Emeritus, and its District Manager is Michelle George.

References

External links
Profile of the Community Board (PDF)
Official website of the Community Board
Brooklyn neighborhood map

Community boards of Brooklyn
Crown Heights, Brooklyn
Prospect Heights, Brooklyn